Hector Lake is a small glacial lake in western Alberta, Canada. It is located on the Bow River, in the Waputik Range of the Canadian Rockies.

It is named after James Hector, a geologist and naturalist with the Palliser Expedition.

The lake is formed in a valley of the Waputik Range, north of the Waputik Icefield, between Pulpit Peak, Mount Balfour, Crowfoot Mountain and Bow Peak. Hector Glacier and Mount Hector rise on the opposite side of the Bow River.

Hector Lake is one of the lakes that line the Icefields Parkway in Banff National Park and Jasper National Park, other such lakes being Bow Lake, Lake Louise, Peyto Lake, Mistaya Lake, Waterfowl Lakes, Chephren Lake and Sunwapta Lake.

References 

Banff National Park
Bow River
Lakes of Alberta
Glacial lakes of Canada